Yauheni Karaliok (born 9 June 1996) is a Belarusian road and track cyclist, who currently rides for UCI Continental team .

He competed at the 2015 UEC European Track Championships in the team pursuit event and at the 2016 UEC European Track Championships also in the team pursuit event.

Major results
2017
 1st  Time trial, National Under-23 Road Championships
 1st Grand Prix Minsk
 8th Road race, National Road Championships
2018
 1st  Scratch, UCI Track Cycling World Championships
 1st Stage 4 Tour of Mersin
 1st Stage 1 Tour of Estonia
 5th Overall Tour of Mevlana
2019 
 1st Minsk Cup
 2nd Grand Prix Alanya
 National Road Championships
3rd Time trial
9th Road race
2020
 1st  Scratch, UCI Track Cycling World Championships
 1st  Time trial, National Road Championships
 2nd Grand Prix Gazipaşa 
 10th GP Manavgat
2021
 1st  Time trial, National Road Championships
2022
 1st Grand Prix Justiniano Hotels

References

External links

1996 births
Living people
Belarusian male cyclists
Place of birth missing (living people)
UCI Track Cycling World Champions (men)
Belarusian track cyclists
Cyclists at the 2019 European Games
European Games medalists in cycling
European Games bronze medalists for Belarus
Cyclists at the 2020 Summer Olympics
Olympic cyclists of Belarus
21st-century Belarusian people